The Journal of Paleontology is a peer-reviewed scientific journal covering the field of paleontology. It is published by the Paleontological Society.

Indexing
The Journal of Paleontology is indexed in:
BIOSIS Previews
Science Citation Index
The Zoological Record
GeoRef

References

Paleontology journals
Publications established in 1927
Academic journals published by learned and professional societies
Cambridge University Press academic journals
Bimonthly journals
Paleontological Society